Richard de Spicer (fl. 1315) was an English politician.

He was a Member (MP) of the Parliament of England for Coventry in 1315.

References

13th-century births
14th-century deaths
English MPs 1315
Members of the Parliament of England for Coventry